Mike Rossi or Michael Rossi may refer to:

 Mike Rossi (DJ) (born 1967), Philadelphia-area DJ accused of cheating in the Lehigh Valley marathon
 Mike Rossi (freestyle skier) (born 1994), American freestyle skier
 Michael Rossi (Peyton Place), a fictional character in the novel Peyton Place
 Michael Matteo Rossi, American film producer, writer and director
 Francis Rossi, frontman of the band Status Quo who was known as Mike Rossi early in his career

See also
Michaël Rossi, a French racing driver